The 2009 WTA Premier tournaments were 19 of the tennis tournaments on the 2009 WTA Tour. The WTA Tour is the elite tour for women's professional tennis. The WTA Premier tournaments all rank below the Grand Slam events and above the WTA International tournaments. They are divided into three levels: Premier Mandatory (Indian Wells, Miami, Madrid and Beijing), Premier 5 (Dubai, Roma, Cincinnati, Canada and Tokyo), and Premier (10 tournaments in Europe, United States and Australia).

Schedule

Premier

References

WTA Premier tournaments
WTA Premier tournaments seasons